Meridiano Televisión is a 24-hour sports network in Venezuela.

History
Meridiano Televisión was created in 1996 as a privately owned television network in Venezuela, exclusively dedicated to national and international sports.  Its owned by Bloque De Armas, a company that is also the owner the newspaper, Diario Meridiano, which also specializes in sports.

With many similarities to the sport network ESPN, Meridiano Televisión transmits almost all sporting events, mainly baseball (the Major League of Baseball and the Venezuelan League of Professional Baseball) because it is considered to be the Venezuelan national sport.  Also, sporting events that are popular in Venezuela and that are widely seen on Meridiano Televisión are Venezuela First Division games, the Spanish La Liga, the AFF Cup, the AFC Cup and the UEFA Champions League and UEFA Euro 2012 among others.

Programming
The most watched programs on Meridiano Televisión are:

Noticiero Meridiano (3 broadcasts a day)
Solo Basket

External links
Official website 

Television channels and stations established in 1996
Television networks in Venezuela
Television stations in Venezuela
Spanish-language television stations